Willian Lira Sousa (born 9 December 1993, in Altamira) is a Brazilian footballer who plays for Kedah Darul Aman. He plays as a forward.

Career

PS Barito Putera
Lira joined PS Barito Putera for loan in the 2017 Liga 1. Lira joined as replace Thiago Cunha who playing for Chonburi FC.

Ventforet Kofu
In 2020, Lira joined J2 club, Ventforet Kofu from 2021 season. On 16 October 2022, he brought his club won 2022 emperor's cup for the first time in history. he left the club in 2022 after two seasons at Kofu.

Honours

Club
Ventforet Kofu
 Emperor's Cup: 2022

References

External links
 Willian Lira - Perfil de Jogador at Meusresultados.com
 Willian Lira at zerozero.pt
 

1993 births
Living people
Brazilian footballers
Brazilian expatriate footballers
Association football forwards
Grêmio Barueri Futebol players
Associação Atlética Santa Rita players
Associação Ferroviária de Esportes players
Campinense Clube players
Sampaio Corrêa Futebol Clube players
Operário Futebol Clube (MS) players
Salgueiro Atlético Clube players
PS Barito Putera players
São Bernardo Futebol Clube players
FK Vardar players
Club Destroyers players
Campeonato Brasileiro Série C players
Liga 1 (Indonesia) players
Macedonian First Football League players
Bolivian Primera División players
Ventforet Kofu players
J2 League players
Brazilian expatriate sportspeople in North Macedonia
Brazilian expatriate sportspeople in Indonesia
Brazilian expatriate sportspeople in Bolivia
Expatriate footballers in North Macedonia
Expatriate footballers in Indonesia
Expatriate footballers in Bolivia
Sportspeople from Pará